Cormac mac Ceithearnach, ruler and cleric, died 881.

Biography

Cormac is described as the prior of Terryglass and Clonfert, "and the second lord who was over Loch Riach at that time."

Loch Riach is a lake at the foot of the Sliabh Eachtaí, located in a territory then called Máenmaige; its ruling dynasty were the Ui Fiachrach Finn. In 802, The demolition of Loch Riach was undertaken by King Muirgius mac Tommaltaig of Connacht.

The town of Loughrea takes its name from Loch Riach.

See also

 Fearghal mac Catharnach. died 881.

External links
 http://www.ucc.ie/celt/published/T100005D/index.html

881 deaths
9th-century Irish abbots
Christian clergy from County Galway
People from County Tipperary
Year of birth unknown